The McGill Redbirds soccer team is an intercollegiate varsity men's soccer team representing McGill University and competes in the RSEQ conference of U Sports. The program has won three U Sports national championships, in 1981, 1982, and 1997. The program also features 17 RSEQ conference championship winners.

Players
The soccer program at McGill operates throughout the entire school year. In addition to the regular U Sports fall season, the Men's team also compete in the RSEQ indoor season running from January to mid March.

McGill Men's Soccer had their most successful season in recent history in Fall 2018. Finishing the season with a 5-4-3 Conference record finishing fourth in the RSEQ conference. The Team went on to lose to the Montreal Carabins in the RSEQ playoffs.

Striker Mehdi Ibn Brahim and central midfielder Ramzi Saim were selected for the RSEQ All Star first team. Defender Chris Flores and striker Florian Bettelli were selected for the RSEQ Second Team and Rookie Team of the Year. Head Coach Marc Mounicot won the Coach of the Year in the RSEQ.

Ramzi Saim went on to gain a further accolade winning a place in the All Canadian Second Team of the Year whilst Florian Bettelli was selected for the All Canadian Rookie Team of the Year.

2021-22 Men's Soccer Roster 

McGill Men's Soccer Roster

Previous Players

Roster (2018-2019)

Coaching staff

References

External links
 

Soc
University and college soccer teams in Canada
Soccer clubs in Montreal
Soccer clubs in Quebec